Kelly Grove Racing (formerly known as Kelly Racing and Nissan Motorsport) was an Australian motor racing team which competes in the Supercars Championship. The team made its debut in 2009, and raced Holden VE Commodores until the end of the 2012 season. In 2013, the team switched to competing with Nissan Altimas, and was rebranded Nissan Motorsport.

Following the Nissan sponsorship concluding, the team was rebranded back to Kelly Racing in 2019. For 2020 Kelly Racing campaigned two Ford Mustang GTs in the championship. The team is based in the Melbourne suburb of Braeside. The team's current drivers are Andre Heimgartner and David Reynolds.

In 2019 the team expanded into the new TCR Australia Touring Car Series, running another four cars, a pair each of Opel Astra TCRs branded as Holden Astras and Subaru WRX STI TCRs. In 2021, the team was rebranded Kelly Grove Racing after the Grove Group bought a majority shareholding in the team.

Kelly Racing

Introduction
Despite some initial hurdles, the team was formed in 2009, after several months of preparation. The two sons of the owners, Rick and Todd were lead drivers for 2009, with sponsorship from Jack Daniel's.  Jack Perkins and Dale Wood (though later replaced by Mark McNally), were confirmed as drivers of the third and fourth Kelly Racing entries.

Formation

After a troubled relationship with Tom Walkinshaw, with whom they formed the HSV Dealer Team, team principals John and Margaret Kelly took their two V8 Supercar Racing Entitlement Contracts (RECs) to set up Kelly Racing, forcing Walkinshaw to find other RECs to run his second team in the championship.

With a decision by Holden to reduce support for most teams running their Commodore product in the series for 2009, along with the impending economic crisis, Larry Perkins chose to scale back his involvement in the sport through his Perkins Engineering team at the end of 2008. A deal was concluded that saw Perkins Engineering sell much of its hardware including cars to the new team, as well as provide engineering services with the functions gradually to be transferred to Kelly Racing. Many of the former Perkins Engineering transferred to Kelly Racing. Perkins also retained ownership of his RECs and was thus the entrant for the team's third and fourth cars.

Racing numbers were swapped so that the Kelly owned licences could make use of the #7 racing number, to suit major sponsor Jack Daniel's and their "Old Number 7" brand.  This sponsorship had been carried over from Perkins Engineering, where Todd Kelly was previously using the #7 racing number.

2009
The new team had its track debut at Winton Raceway on 3 March 2009, running the allowed 20-lap shakedown test for newly constructed cars in the V8 Supercar category, which was declared a success by both Todd and Rick. Following this initial shakedown, the team appeared at the official category test day at the same circuit on 9 March 2009, where all four cars appeared.

The team's first race was the 2009 Clipsal 500. The two Kelly brothers finished in the top ten in the first race, Todd in 7th and Rick in 10th, after starting 24th and 17th respectively. Wood, who did not set a qualifying time after a crash in practice, finished 14th after starting from pitlane. Perkins failed to finish due to badly damaged steering caused by brushing the wall. Rick was the only one of the four drivers to finish the second race, again in 10th place. Todd Kelly and Jack Perkins both inflicted steering damage from contact with other cars while Dale Wood spun into the wall. The team left the weekend with Rick Kelly 8th in the championship standings, Todd Kelly in 16th, Dale Wood in 24th and Jack Perkins in 30th. Todd made the following comment on the team's first weekend: "Getting an event under our belt, we've now got pages and pages of things we need to address and improve on.  This is our first race as a brand new team so given that, I think the weekend wasn't too bad."

Todd and Rick achieved numerous top ten results as the season went on, the best being Rick's 4th places at Winton and Hidden Valley, while Perkins and Wood struggled. Wood was replaced by Mark McNally from the Townsville round onwards.

Todd and Rick teamed up in the #7 car for the endurances races at Phillip Island and Bathurst with Nathan Pretty and Ben Collins driving the #15 car. Dale Wood returned to the driving seat to partner Jack Perkins in the #11 car while Tony Ricciardello joined Mark McNally in the #16 car. The Kelly brothers finished fifth in the L&H 500 after Todd won one of the qualifying races. Bet 24/7 came on board as major sponsor for the #11 car before Bathurst, with Perkins and Wood running #247 for the Bathurst weekend. Todd and Rick Kelly were running in second place with only a handful of laps to go in the Bathurst 1000, but a damaged rear wing and a late safety car led to the brothers finishing in eighth place.

Perkins reverted to #11 for the remainder of the season. The team scored its first podium finish at the Island 300, which turned out to be the first in a hat-trick of podiums for the team, with Rick finishing third and second at Phillip Island and Todd finishing second in race one at Barbagallo. The final championship standings saw Rick Kelly finish in eighth, Todd Kelly in 18th, Jack Perkins in 26th, Dale Wood in 29th and Mark McNally in 30th. Jack Daniel's Racing (#7 and #15) finished sixth in teams' championship with Kelly Racing (#11 and #16) in 13th and last of the two car teams.

2010
In 2010 Jason Bargwanna and Tony Ricciardello joined the team.

Rick took the team's first pole position at Winton but did not manage a win. Only one podium result came out of 2010, Rick finishing third in the rain-affected first race of the Sydney 500.

For the endurance races, Rick and Todd were not allowed to pair up due to new regulations regarding endurance co-drivers. Owen Kelly, of no relation to the two brothers, joined Rick in the #15 car while Dale Wood drove with Todd. Ricciardello was partnered by Taz Douglas while two-time Australian touring car champion Glenn Seton partnered Bargwanna. Rick and Owen had a strong run at the Phillip Island 500, finishing fourth after needing to conserve fuel at the end of the race, while the other three cars all finished outside the top fifteen. The team had a disappointing Bathurst, with none of the cars finishing in the top ten, the best result 16th place for Rick and Owen.

The team hired Scott Dixon and Alex Tagliani as its international drivers for the Gold Coast 600, Dixon driving with Todd Kelly and Tagliani with Bargwanna. Owen Kelly remained with Rick and Wood moved into the #16 car with Ricciardello. It proved to be another average weekend, with Rick and Owen again providing the best result, a sixth place in race two.

The final championship standings saw Rick and Todd repeat their 2009 efforts, finishing eighth and 18th respectively. Bargwanna ended up 24th and Ricciardello was 26th. Jack Daniel's Racing was fifth in the teams' championship and Kelly Racing was 11th.

2011
The Jack Daniel's Racing drivers remained the same for 2011, but two new drivers were hired for Kelly Racing, Greg Murphy and David Reynolds.

2011 was the team's most successful season to date. Rick Kelly scored the team's first race win in wet conditions at the Hamilton 400. Todd made it an extra special day by finishing in third place despite having a broken windscreen wiper. Rick won a further two races, with a win in Darwin at Hidden Valley and a win at Sandown later in the season, placing 6th in the championship. Todd for a third year straight placed 18th in the series, Reynolds  impressed on his return to V8 Supercars, with numerous top ten qualifying efforts and two top five race results, eventually placing 19th. Murphy placed a respectable 13th in the Pepsi Max Holden.

For the endurance races, the team signed David Russell, Allan Simonsen, Owen Kelly and Tim Blanchard to drive with the team, with Russell joining Todd in Car #7, Simonsen joining Murphy in car #11, Owen Kelly joining Rick in #15 and Blanchard pairing up with Reynolds in #16. For the Gold Coast 600, the team signed Richard Westbrook to drive with Todd, Oliver Gavin to drive with Murphy, Jörg Bergmeister to drive with Rick and Alex Tagliani to join Reynolds. At Phillip Island, all cars finished in the top 15, with car #16 the best in 6th. At Bathurst, a fifth car was entered, the #77 Shannons-Mars Racing Commodore, with Grant Denyer and Cameron Waters driving the car. Car #11 claimed Pole position, with #16 qualifying in 4th, the Jack Daniels cars qualified in 16th and 19th, car #77 qualified 29th and Last. Murphy and Simonsen eventually finished 11 seconds behind the winners in 3rd position, with car #16 finishing in 19th, Car #15 placing 22nd and Car #7 placing 24th, some 7 laps down on Murphy and Simonsen, the fifth car of Denyer and Waters did not finish.

2012
2012 started with the announcement that they would switch to Nissan for 2013 making them the first team to change manufacturers for the new regulations.

Rebirth as Nissan Motorsport

2013
In January 2013 the RECs of Larry Perkins were purchased for the third and fourth entries. For 2013 the team was rebranded as Nissan Motorsport. Michael Caruso and James Moffat were recruited to drive the third and fourth entries.

2014
All four drivers continued with the team in 2014. After the 2014 Season, Norton ended their title sponsorship of the Moffat and Caruso entries.

2015
For 2015, the Norton inspired race numbers, #36 and #360, were replaced, with Caruso changing to Nissan's traditional #23 (a wordplay on the marque itself, "ni" meaning two and "san" meaning three) and Moffat to #99. Jack Daniels also downsized their sponsorship to just the #15 car of Rick Kelly, with Carsales replacing Jack Daniels on the #7 car of Todd Kelly.

2016
Moffat left the team at the end of 2015 with Dale Wood returning to the team. Caruso won a race for the team at Hidden Valley. The Team also ran a fifth entry in the Bathurst 1000, with Renee Gracie and Simona de Silvestro driving the #360 Harvey Norman Supergirls Altima. The entry placed 14th.

2017
In 2017, Dale Wood was be replaced by Simona de Silvestro. Todd Kelly, Rick Kelly and Michael Caruso remained with the team.

2018
For 2018, Todd Kelly retired and was replaced by Andre Heimgartner. Rick Kelly, Michael Caruso and Simona de Silvestro continued with the team.

Rebirth as Kelly Racing

2019
Following the termination of Nissan's sponsorship, in 2019 the team resumed operating under the Kelly Racing brand. The team will continue to compete with the Nissan Altima under licence from the company.

2020
In 2020 the team scaled back to two cars and switched to running Ford Mustang GTs. The surplus RECs were sold to Team 18 and Matt Stone Racing.

Rebirth as Kelly Grove Racing

2021
The team was rebranded as Kelly Grove Racing, after the Grove Group bought a 50% shareholding.

Rick Kelly announced his retirement at the end of 2020, he was replaced by David Reynolds who returned to the team. Reynolds brought sponsorship from Penrite, with the car changing to #26 (representing 1926, the year in which Penrite was founded) and his Race Engineer Alistair McVean. Andre Heimgartner continued with the team in car #7.

2022
In 2022, Grove Group will take 100% ownership with the team rebranded Grove Racing. Neither Kelly will continue their involvement with the team.

Results

Car No. 3 results

Car No. 7 results

Car No. 26 results

Car No. 78 results

Bathurst 1000 results

 Wildcard Entries are listed in Italics

Supercars Championship drivers
The following is a list of drivers who have driven for the team in V8 Supercars, in order of their first appearance. Drivers who only drove for the team in an endurance race co-driver basis are listed in italics.

 Todd Kelly (2009–17)
 Rick Kelly (2009–20)
 Jack Perkins (2009)
 Dale Wood (2009–10, 2016, 2019–20)
 Mark McNally (2009)
 Nathan Pretty (2009)
 Tony Ricciardello (2009–10)
 Ben Collins (2009)
 Jason Bargwanna (2010)
 Glenn Seton (2010)
 Owen Kelly (2010–12)
 Taz Douglas (2010, 2013–15)
 Scott Dixon (2010)
 Alex Tagliani (2010–11)
 Greg Murphy (2011–12)
 David Reynolds (2011, 2021)
 David Russell (2011–17)
 Allan Simonsen (2011)
 Tim Blanchard (2011–12)
 Richard Westbrook (2011)
 Oliver Gavin (2011)
 Jörg Bergmeister (2011)
 Karl Reindler (2012–13)
 Jacques Villeneuve (2012)
 Daniel Gaunt (2012–13)
 Marco Andretti (2012)
 Franck Montagny (2012)
 Graham Rahal (2012)
 Justin Wilson (2012)
 Michael Caruso (2013–18)
 James Moffat (2013–15)
 Alex Buncombe (2014–15)
 Dean Fiore (2014–19)
 Matt Campbell (2016, 2021)
 Russell Ingall (2016)
 Simona de Silvestro (2016–19)
 David Wall (2017)
 Jack Le Brocq (2017)
 Andre Heimgartner (2018–present)
 Aaren Russell (2018)
 Garry Jacobson (2018–19)
 Alex Rullo (2018–19)
 Bryce Fullwood (2019)
 Dylan O'Keeffe (2020)
 Luke Youlden (2021)

Super2 drivers 
The following is a list of drivers who have driven for the team in Super2 Series, in order of their first appearance. Drivers who only drove for the team in an endurance race co-driver basis are listed in italics.
 Owen Kelly (2010)
 Grant Denyer (2011)
 Cameron Waters (2011)
 Matthew Payne (2021)

References

External links
 Official website

Australian auto racing teams
Sports teams in Victoria (Australia)
Auto racing teams disestablished in 2021
Supercars Championship teams
2009 establishments in Australia
2021 disestablishments in Australia
Nissan in motorsport
Auto racing teams established in 2009
Organisations based in Melbourne